Anglian Windows Limited, trading as Anglian Home Improvements, is a British home improvements firm specialising in double and triple glazing windows, front and back doors and conservatories. However, over the last fifty years, the Anglian product portfolio has expanded to include porches, orangeries, single storey extensions, garage doors, roof trim (fascias, soffits, gutters, and bargeboard), cladding, and bi-fold doors.

History

Anglian Windows, now branded as Anglian Home Improvements and trading as part of the Anglian Group, was established in 1966 by George Williams when he opened a factory in Norwich. In 1969 the first showroom opened in Ipswich before the company expanded its factory a year later selling PVCu products. Over the next few decades, Anglian grew to become a market leader, fitting over half a million products each year.

In 1984, Anglian was acquired for £30 million by British Electric Traction. During the next few years, the company expanded its product range to include conservatories, doors and stained-glass overlay. This rise to success in the double-glazing industry was not easy; the recession during the 1980s hurt Anglian's profits, which saw a management buyout in 1991. This change in management lead to the company doing well and they spent nearly ten years on the London Stock Exchange. The continued success led the company to re-brand as Anglian Home Improvements in 1997. The rebrand helped the company to continue performing well, with sales and profits growing, and they became a founder member of the Fenestration Self-Assessment Scheme (FENSA).  A few years down the line, the holding company Anglian Group, was bought by investment group Alchemy Partners  who then sold to a consortium of banks in 2008. In January 2010, Anglian Windows founder, George Williams, died following an illness.

In 2015, the investment group Alchemy Partners returned to become Anglian Group's majority shareholder and the company continues to grow from strength to strength.

In March 2020, in response to the Covid-19 Pandemic, Anglian suspended all communication with customers, going into total shutdown including all repair and customer services, leaving many customers with partially complete and unsafe works. During their hiatus, the company worked on developing an online supply only catalogue, which was added to their website in the summer of 2020. The company began taking new customer orders again in June 2020, although they did not start to complete the backlog of existing work until September 2020.

Turnover
Financial Year ending March 2019, employing over 1500 people, Anglian's total turnover was £217 million.

Unsolicited marketing calls
In November 2012, the Information Commissioner's Office publicly listed Anglian Windows as one of a number of companies that it had concerns about, due to unsolicited telephone calls for marketing. The concerns were based on complaints. In response, Anglian Windows said that it took complaints seriously.

Following these concerns, Anglian became the first TPS Assured company, a scheme set up to combat the growing reputational threat of so-called 'nuisance calls' made by rogue businesses operating outside the law.

Corporate social responsibility
As part of their Corporate Social Responsibility (CSR), Anglian have been seen to support community sports throughout the UK and regional charities.

References

External links
 

Window manufacturers
Home improvement companies of the United Kingdom
English brands